"Come Cryin' to Me" is a song recorded by American country music group Lonestar and it was released in April 1997 as the first single from their second studio album Crazy Nights. The song reached the top of the Billboard Hot Country Singles & Tracks chart. The song was the band's second Number One hit, as well as the first single of their career to be co-written by then-member John Rich, who later left the band in 1998 to pursue a solo career. It was written by Rich with Wally Wilson and Mark D. Sanders.

Content
The song tells the story of a man who likes a woman due to a bad relationship. The narrator exclaims that he will always be there for her as a crying shoulder when she needs someone to turn to.

Music video
The music video was directed by Roger Pistole, using The Mavericks What a Crying Shame video, and features Raul Malo lip syncing Richie McDonald's vocals.

Chart performance
This song debuted at number 51 on the Hot Country Singles & Tracks chart dated May 10, 1997. It charted for 20 weeks on that chart, and reached number 1 on the chart dated August 16, 1997, giving the band their second Number One single.

Charts

Year-end charts

References

1997 singles
Lonestar songs
Songs written by John Rich
Songs written by Mark D. Sanders
BNA Records singles
Songs written by Wally Wilson
1997 songs